Tomi Matti Mäkelä (born 4 January 1964 in Lahti) is a Finnish musicologist and pianist, professor at the Martin-Luther-Universität Halle-Wittenberg in Germany. He studied music and musicology in Lahti, Vienna, Berlin (West) and Helsinki. As a pianist he studied with Rauno Jussila and Noel Flores. He got his doctoral degree 1988 in Berlin under the guidance of Carl Dahlhaus. He has published widely on the music of the nineteenth and twentieth century. His German book on Sibelius Poesie in der Luft (Breitkopf & Härtel 2007) got the award Geisteswissenschaft international 2008 and was published in English translation by Steven Lindberg as Jean Sibelius (2011).

Works
 with Christoph Kammertöns & Lena Esther Ptasczynski (eds.): Friedrich Wieck – Gesammelte Schriften über Musik und Musiker [...] mit einer Einführung [by Tomi Mäkelä] (Interdisziplinäre Studien zur Musik 10), Peter Lang, Frankfurt am Main etc. 2019; ; 390 pages
 Saariaho, Sibelius und andere. Neue Helden des neuen Nordens. 100 Jahre Musik und Bildung in Finnland, Georg Olms, Hildesheim etc. 2014; 
 Friedrich Pacius. Ein deutscher Komponist in Finnland. Mit einer Edition der Tagebücher, Briefe und Arbeitsmaterialien von Silke Bruns, Georg Olms, Hildesheim etc. 2014; 
Jean Sibelius und seine Zeit, Laaber, Laaber 2013; 
Jean Sibelius, Boydell, Woodbridge, Suffolk, and Rochester, NY 2011; ; 536 pages
Fredrik Pacius, kompositör i Finland, Svenska Litteratursällskapet i Finland, Helsinki 2009; ; 268 pages
Sibelius, me ja muut, Teos, Helsinki 2007; 
Jean Sibelius. "Poesie in der Luft“. Studien zu Leben und Werk, Breitkopf & Härtel, Wiesbaden-Leipzig-Paris 2007; 
Klang und Linie von Pierrot lunaire bis Ionisation. Studien zur Wechselwirkung von Spezialensemble, Formbildung und Klangfarbenpolyphonie (Interdisziplinäre Studien zur Musik 3), Peter Lang, Frankfurt/ M 2004
Tomi Mäkelä, Tobias Robert Klein (Eds.), Mehrsprachigkeit und regionale Bindung in Musik und Literatur (Interdisziplinäre Studien zur Musik 1), Peter Lang, Frankfurt/ M 2004
Aarre Merikantos Konzert ("Schott-Konzert“) (Nordische Meisterwerke 2, Eds. Heinrich W. Schwab/ Harald Herrestahl), Florian Noetzel, Wilhelmshafen 1996
Virtuosität und Werkcharakter. Eine analytische und theoretische Untersuchung zur Virtuosität in den Klavierkonzerten der Hochromantik. (Berliner musikwissenschaftliche Arbeiten 37, Eds. Carl Dahlhaus/ Rudolf Stephan), Katzbichler, München/ Salzburg 1989
Training and the Knowledge-Based Society. An Evaluation of Doctoral Education in Finland / David D. Dill, Sanjit K. Mitra, Hans Siggaard Jensen, Erno Lehtinen, Tomi Mäkelä, Anna Parpala, Hannele Pohjola, Mary A. Ritter & Seppo Saari, PhD (Publications of the Finnish Higher Education Evaluation Council 2006, 1, FHEEC, Tampere 2006

References

External links
http://www.musikwiss.uni-halle.de/kontaktinformationen/mitarbeiterinnen/147539_1984400/
http://www.boersenverein.de/de/158446/Pressemitteilungen/211720/

Living people
1964 births
Academic staff of the Martin Luther University of Halle-Wittenberg
Finnish musicologists
Finnish pianists
20th-century Finnish male musicians
21st-century Finnish male musicians
21st-century pianists
Sibelius scholars